Center Township is a township in Atchison County, Kansas, United States. As of the 2010 census, its population was 625.

Geography

The streams of Little Stranger Creek and Mooney Creek run through this township.

References
 USGS Geographic Names Information System (GNIS)

External links
 US-Counties.com
 City-Data.com

Townships in Atchison County, Kansas
Townships in Kansas